"Operation Blade (Bass in the Place)" (also titled "Operation Blade (Bass in the Place London)") is a hard trance song by Scottish electronic group Public Domain, written and produced by the group's three members: Mark Sherry, Alistair MacIsaac, and James Allan. It samples a remix of New Order's song "Confusion", which was featured in the 1998 superhero horror film Blade, the source of the track's title. "Operation Blade" is also based on the theme to the 1982 science-fiction film Blade Runner.

The song was released on 20 November 2000 as Public Domain's debut single. On 26 November, it debuted at number five on the UK Singles Chart and stayed at that position for another week. Throughout December 2000 and early 2001, the track charted in at least 10 other countries, peaking within the top 10 in Australia, Austria, Germany, and Norway. It was also critically successful, with British publication NME calling it "hardcore brilliance". In April 2001, it was included on Public Domain's only studio album, Hard Hop Superstars.

Critical reception
British music journalism website NME called "Operation Blade" a "gleefully manic song" and described it as "no-frills hardcore brilliance". Matthias Völlm of Swiss CHR radio station Radio 105 called the song "good" but doubted its airplay potential.

Track listings
UK 12-inch vinyl
 "Operation Blade (Bass in the Place)" (original mix) – 8:22
 "Operation Blade (Bass in the Place)" (B'n'G Mix) – 5:44

European and Australian CD single
 "Operation Blade (Bass in the Place)" (7-inch radio edit) – 3:07
 "Operation Blade (Bass in the Place)" (original mix) – 8:21
 "Operation Blade (Bass in the Place)" (B'n'G vs. Musico remix) – 5:43

12-inch vinyl (2006 remix)'''
 "Operation Blade (Bass in the Place)" (2006 remix) – 8:15
 "Operation Blade (Bass in the Place)" (2006 XXX remix) – 7:54

Charts

Weekly charts

Year-end charts

Certifications

Release history

References

External links
 The story behind "Public Domain – Operation Blade" with Mark Sherry  Muzikxpress 064

2000 debut singles
2000 songs
2001 singles
Acid house songs
Trance songs